Gregory Devon Johnson (born December 3, 1953) is a former American football defensive lineman. Drafted by the Philadelphia Eagles, he had brief stints with several teams, appearing in games for the Baltimore Colts and Tampa Bay Buccaneers in 1977.

References 

1953 births
Living people
People from Leesburg, Florida
American football defensive ends
Florida State Seminoles football players
Tampa Bay Buccaneers players